ABM Nurul Alam or  Abu Barek Mohammad Nurul Alam was a Bangladesh physician who was killed in the Bangladesh Liberation war. He is considered a martyr in Bangladesh.

Early life
Alam was born in Dhantala, Bochaganj, Dinajpur, East Bengal, British India in 1929. He was involved in the Bengali language movement. He graduated from Dhaka Medical College in 1961 after completing his MBBS.

Career
Alam joined the Santahar Railway Hospital as an assistant surgeon. On 25 March 1971, the Bangladesh Liberation war started with the start of Operation Searchlight. Communal riots broke out between the Bengali and non-Bengali (Bihari) residents of Santahar. He provided medical aid to the injured. On 26 March 1971, he and his family sought refuge in the hospital after the Pakistan Army with the help of non-Bengali people attacked the Bengali people. He and his family moved Haisabari, Naogaon then Shahbazpur, Rajshahi. He moved to Rajshahi town (now city) with the aim to move to India. He was arrested by Pakistan army from a pharmacy in the city on allegations that he helped Mukti Bahini. He was taken to Zoha Hall of Rajshahi University.

Death
Alam was shot and killed on 20 November 1971 while in Pakistan Army custody.

References

1929 births
1971 deaths
People killed in the Bangladesh Liberation War
Dhaka Medical College alumni
People from Dinajpur District, Bangladesh
Bangladeshi surgeons
20th-century surgeons